An artois was a long cloak worn by women in the 18th century. It was made with several capes, having lapels and revers like a box coat.

References 

Robes and cloaks
18th-century fashion
History of clothing
History of clothing (Western fashion)